Sir James Talbot Airey  (6 September 1812 – 1 January 1898) was an officer of the British Army. He served during the First Anglo-Afghan War and the Crimean War, rising to the rank of general.

Biography
Airey was born on 6 September 1812, the son of Lieutenant-General Sir George Airey, by Catherine, sister of Richard Talbot, 2nd Baron Talbot de Malahide. Richard, Lord Airey, was his brother. He was commissioned as ensign in the 30th Foot on 11 February 1830, became lieutenant on 3 May 1833, and exchanged to the 3rd Buffs on 23 August. He was aide-de-camp to the governor of Madras, Sir Frederick Adam, from May 1834 to July 1837. On 26 January 1841 he was appointed extra aide-de-camp to Major-General William George Keith Elphinstone, and accompanied him to Afghanistan during the First Anglo-Afghan War. In the latter part of that year he was present at the forcing of the Khoord Cabul pass, and the actions near Kabul, and on 21 December he was given up of his own accord to Akbar Khan as a hostage. He was released with the other captives on 21 September 1842, joined the force sent into Kohistan under Brigadier M'Caskill, and was present at the capture of Istalif. He was twice mentioned in despatches (12 October 1841 and 30 September 1842), and received the Afghan medal. He also received the Gwalior Star for the Gwalior campaign of 1843, in which he took part with his regiment. He was promoted captain on 22 July 1842, and was aide-de-camp to the governor of Ceylon from April 1847 to March 1851. On 11 November 1851 he became regimental major, and on 17 July 1854 he exchanged to the Coldstream Guards as captain and lieutenant-colonel.

He served throughout the Crimea War with the Light Division as assistant quartermaster-general, being present at the Battles of Alma, Balaclava, Inkerman, and the assault on the Redan, and he accompanied the expedition to Kerch. He was three times mentioned in despatches (28 September and 11 November 1854, 18 September 1855). He received the Crimea Medal with four clasps, the Turkish Crimea Medal, the Legion of Honour (5th class), and the Medjidie (4th class). He was made a Companion of the Bath on 5 July 1855. He was promoted colonel on 26 December 1859, and became regimental major in the Coldstream Guards on 22 May 1866. He was promoted major-general on 6 March 1868, and commanded the troops at Malta from 21 August 1875 to 31 December 1878. He became lieutenant-general on 1 October 1877, and was placed on the retired list on 1 July 1881, with the honorary rank of general. He was made Knight Commander of the Bath on 2 June 1877, and colonel of the 2nd Battalion, Royal Inniskilling Fusiliers on 13 March 1886, a position he held until his death.

He died in London on 1 January 1898. He was unmarried.

References

 

1812 births
1898 deaths
Military personnel from London
Knights Commander of the Order of the Bath
British Army generals
British military personnel of the First Anglo-Afghan War
British Army personnel of the Crimean War
30th Regiment of Foot officers
Buffs (Royal East Kent Regiment) officers
Coldstream Guards officers
Royal Inniskilling Fusiliers officers
Chevaliers of the Légion d'honneur
Recipients of the Order of the Medjidie, 4th class